For the earlier silent.film of the same name see The Foolish Virgin (1916 film)

The Foolish Virgin is a lost 1924 American silent romantic drama film released by Columbia Pictures. It was directed by George W. Hill and stars Elaine Hammerstein. It is based on the 1915 novel The Foolish Virgin: A Romance of Today by Thomas Dixon Jr. This is the second known adaptation of the novel; the first was released in 1916.

Plot
Jim Owens (Frazer) rescues Mary Adams (Hammerstein) from a scheming lawyer. Jim is successful inventor, however Mary is unaware that he has a history as a thief before they met. They fall in love and get married. Mary leaves Jim when she discovers his criminal history. In the end Jim rescues Mary and their child from a forest fire, renewing Mary's love for Jim. The 1924 plot notably differs from the book and the 1916 film. In the earlier versions Jim's thievery continued during the marriage, and only he reformed his ways after losing Mary.

Cast
Elaine Hammerstein as Mary Adams
Robert Frazer as Jim Owens / Eiphann Owens
Gladys Brockwell as Nance Owens
Phyllis Haver as Jane Sanderson
Lloyd Whitlock as Charles Spencer
Irene Hunt as Mrs. Dawson
Howard Truesdale as Dr. Dawson
Jack Henderson as Sam Allen
Roscoe Karns as Chuck Brady
Oliver Cross as Lawson Howard
Edward W. Borman as Dan O'Leary (credited as Edward Borman)
Spec O'Donnell as Little Boy
Billy Seay as Jim Owens as a Boy (uncredited)

Critical reception
While Variety magazine in 1924 wrote that "It should please the average audience", in 1925 Photoplay magazine described The Foolish Virgin as "silly, uninteresting, tiresome".

References

External links

Lost American films
1924 films
American silent feature films
American black-and-white films
Films based on works by Thomas Dixon Jr.
American romantic drama films
1924 romantic drama films
1920s American films
Silent romantic drama films
Silent American drama films